Songezo Jim (born September 17, 1990 in Umtata) is a South African cyclist, who last rode for UCI Continental team . He was named in the start list for the 2015 Vuelta a España, becoming the first black South African rider to compete in the race. He was named in the start list for the 2016 Giro d'Italia.

Major results
2012
 African Road Championships
3rd Under-23 road race
6th Road race
2013
 4th Overall La Tropicale Amissa Bongo

Grand Tour general classification results timeline

References

External links

1990 births
Living people
People from Mthatha
South African male cyclists
Sportspeople from the Eastern Cape